Roger and Out is the debut studio album of country music artist Roger Miller, which was released under the Smash Records label in 1964. The second release did not chart but the first reached #3 on country album charts and #37 on the Billboard 200, and was ultimately certified as Gold by the RIAA.

Two singles were released from the album including "Chug-a-Lug" and "Dang Me." Both peaked in the top 10 on the Country, Billboard Hot 100, and Canadian charts, with the latter handing Miller the first #1 hit of his recording career.

The album took only two days to record, and did not include all material cut from the session, however Roger and Out was the first release of material from this period.

Reception
Critics were astonished at how well the first single had done, considering its differences with the British Invasion material dominating radio at the time. Allmusic reviewed the album long after its release, and gave it 4 stars, citing the "unique" and "rich" talent of Miller, displayed on the album. "Chug-a-Lug" and "Dang Me" were mentioned as "classics" and the track "Got 2 Again," was described as "catchy." Although the reviewer stated that the "playing" on the album was "top notch" and "the concept original," the record's shortness was criticized and compared to trying to drive to "Nashville on half a tank of gas."

Track listing

Chart positions

Singles

Personnel

Roger Miller - guitar, vocals
Ray Edenton - guitar  
Buddy Harman - drums  
Bob Moore - bass

References

1964 debut albums
Roger Miller albums
Albums produced by Jerry Kennedy
Smash Records albums
Vertigo Records albums